Niphona celebensis is a species of beetle in the family Cerambycidae. It was described by Stephan von Breuning in 1961. It is known from Sulawesi.

References

celebensis
Beetles described in 1961